Angelico Aprosio (29 October 1607 – 23 February 1681) was an Italian Augustine monk, scholar, and bibliophile.

Biography 
He entered the Augustinian order on March 19, 1623, while still but 15 years of age, changing his baptismal name of Ludovico to Angelico. In 1639 he was appointed professor of belles-lettres, at the convent of St. Stephen in Venice, and subsequently Vicar general of Santa Maria della Consolazione. He acquired a high reputation by his numerous works on literary criticism and other subjects, among which are a moral essay against the luxury and extravagance of women, entitled "The Shield of Rinaldo," ("Lo Scudo di Rinaldo," 1642,) and "La Biblioteca Aprosiana," (1673) one of the earliest and most comprehensive select bibliographies of Italian literature. The first part of the volume, contains his autobiography and the account of his correspondence. The second part is a partial catalogue of the books, arranged under the first names of the donors in alphabetical order. Both parts are replete with biographical and bibliographical notes, many of great length. Johann Christoph Wolf, the compiler of the standard Bibliotheca hebraea (4 vols., Hamburg, 1715 – 33), translated the Biblioteca into Latin (Hamburg, 1734) and provided it with a necessary index containing the names of both donors and authors. Aprosio founded in his native city a library called "Aprosiana", established in 1648 at the Augustinian monastery of Ventimiglia.

The Aprosian Library housed over ten thousand volumes and was officially recognized in 1653 by Pope Innocent X, who issued a ban prohibiting the sale of any of its books and opened it to the public. In the following years, Aprosio dedicated himself to expanding the library, enlarging the monastery to hold its volumes, and compiling its catalogue.

The Aprosian Library was partly dispersed in 1798 upon the arrival of French troops and the suppression of the Augustinian order. Part of the collection ended up in the National Library of Genoa.

Aprosio was a member of several academies and learned societies, including the Incogniti of Venice,  the Apatisti of Florence, the Geniali of Codogno, the Ansiosi of Gubbio, the Infecondi of Rome, and the Eterocliti of Pesaro.

Works 

 Il Vaglio critico di Masoto Galistoni da Terama sopra il Mondo Nuovo del cav. Tomaso Stigliani da Matera, Rostock, 1637. This is a critique upon the first canto of Stigliani's poem, “Il Mondo Nuovo,” and was written in retaliation for his criticism upon the “Adone” of Giambattista Marino. The name assumed by Aprosio is an anagram of Stigliani's own name.
 Il Buratto. Replica di Carlo Galistoni al Molino del signor Stigliani, Venezia, 1642.
 L'Occhiale Stritolato di Scipio Glareano, per riposta al signor cavaliere Tomaso Stigliani, Venezia, 1641.
 La Sferza poetica, di Sapricio Saprici, lo scantonato accademico eteroclito. Per riposta alla prima censura dell'Adone del cavaliere Marino, fatta dal cavalier Tomaso Stigliani, Venezia, 1643.
 Del Veratro, apologia di Sapricio Saprici, per riposta alla seconda censura dell'Adone del cavalier Marino, fatta dal cavalier Tomaso Stigliani, parte prima, Venezia, 1645, parte seconda, Venezia, 1647.
 Annotazioni di Oldauro Scioppio all'arte degli amanti dell'ill. signor Pietro Michiele nobile veneto, Venezia, 1642.
 Sermoni di tutte le Domeniche, e Festività de' Santi, che occorrono nell'Avvento del Signore fino alla Purificazione della Vergine, disposti in varie risoluzioni morali, per Opera del P. Agostino Osorio Provinciale ne' Regni della Corona di Aragona, trasportati della Spagnola nell'Italiana favella da Oldauro Scioppio, Venezia, 1643.
 Lo Scudo di Rinaldo, o vero lo specchio del disinganno, opera di Scipio Glareano, Venezia, 1642.
 Le Bellezze della Belisa, tragedia dell'Ill. signor D. Antonio Muscettola, abbozzate da Oldauro Scioppio, Accademico Incognito e Geniale, Lovano, 1664.
 
 Le Vigilie del Capricorno, note tumultuarie di Paolo Genari di Scio, Accademico Incognito di Venetia, alle epistole eroiche, poesie dell'eruditissimo signor Lorenzo Crasso, avvocato napolitano, Venezia, 1667.
 
  Alphabetically organized by the names of scholars who donated works (often their own) to Angelico Aprosio's library, this compilation of a private library open to scholars amounts to a comprehensive select bio-bibliography of Italian literature. Although Aprosio may not have expected many scholars to visit his library, he clearly wished to interest them in his books, to advertise his collection, and to display his wide acquaintanceship in contemporary Italian literary circles.
 
 La Visieria alzata ; Hecatoste di Scrittori che vaghi d'andare in maschera, fuor del tempo di carnavale, sono scoperti da Giovanne Pietro Giacomo Villani, Senese, accademico humorista, infecondo & geniale. Passatempo canicolare inviato all'ill. signor Antonio Magliabechi, Parma, 1689. An early bibliography of pseudonymous authors (perhaps the first), La Visieria alzata was anonymously and posthumously published in 1689 in Parma, per gli Heredi del Vigna, under the editorship of Giovanni Pietro Villani of the Siena Academy. The publication is dedicated to Antonio Magliabecchi (1633–1714), Aprosio's friend, colleague, and fellow bibliomane, under whose influence and encouragement the book is generally thought to have been published and who, not improbably, provided information to Aprosio during its preparation. Vincent Placcius has inserted the work, separated into many parts, in his Theatrum Anonymorum et Pseudonymorum.
 Pentecoste d'altri scrittori, che andando in Maschera fuor del tempo di carnevale, sono scoperti.

Notes

Bibliography 
  
  
 Eugenio Mele, Opere del Gracián e d'altri autori spagnuoli fra le mani del P. Casalicchio, in Giornale storico della letteratura italiana, LXXXII (1923), p. 74.
 Quinto Marini, Frati barocchi: studi su A.G. Brignole Sale, G.A. De Marini, A. Aprosio, F. F. Frugoni, e P. Segneri, Modena, Mucchi, 2000.

External links 
 
 

1607 births
1681 deaths
People from Ventimiglia
Italian scholars
Book and manuscript collectors
Italian bibliographers
Augustinians
Italian bibliophiles
Italian Roman Catholic writers